Peter Keglevic may refer to:

 Petar Keglević (died in 1554 or 1555), ban of Croatia and Slavonia
 Péter Keglevich (1660–1724), Croatian nobleman, governor and military officer
 Peter Keglevic (born 1950), Austrian film director and screenwriter